The Queens of Comedy is a 2000 American stand-up comedy film directed by Steve Purcell that is a spin-off film of The Original Kings of Comedy, both of which were produced by Walter Latham. The film follows the performances and behind-the-scenes conversations of four black, female stand-up comedians at Memphis, Tennessee's Orpheum Theatre.

Laura Hayes opens the show and serves as MC. She tells family stories about her grandchildren, her mother, and her sisters. Adele Givens urges her audience to celebrate their flaws; she comments on this crazy world, her 92-year-old grandmother, and the need to take care when naming a baby. Sommore, recently released from jail, talks about children, men, marriage, and why mothers give their eight-year old daughters a hula-hoop. Lastly, Mo'Nique celebrates big women and contrasts blacks and whites. She tries to give big women hope, that it is ok to be a big woman, and it is ok to dislike skinny women.

The film also cuts to footage of the queens on the town having fun. For one night only, eight years later, the ladies returned for a comeback on The Mo'Nique Show, which aired on October 29, 2009.

Airing
The Queens of Comedy premiered on Showtime in the United States. It has aired internationally in Europe, the United Kingdom and Ireland, and it has been subtitled in Germany, the Netherlands and Sweden. In Africa, it aired in South Africa, Ghana, Liberia, and Nigeria.

External links

 

2001 films
2001 comedy films
American documentary films
American independent films
Paramount Pictures films
Stand-up comedy concert films
2000s English-language films
2000s American films